Wimborne Town Football Club is a football club based in Wimborne Minster in Dorset, England. They were established in 1878 and won the FA Vase in 1992. They reached the First Round Proper of the FA Cup in the 1982–83 season for the first time.

For the 2018–2019 season, the club is playing in the Southern Premier South. 
The club is affiliated to the Dorset County Football Association and is a FA Chartered Standard club.

Club history
Wimborne Town Football Club was formed in 1878 and originally catered for football and rugby. In 1884, Wimborne Town were one of the founder members of the South Hampshire and Dorset Football Association. In 1887 the club became a founder member of the Dorset County Football Association.

The club's first piece of Silverware was in 1913 when they won the Dorset Minor Cup for the only time in their history. They almost achieved more silverware a year later when they finished as Runners up in the Dorset Junior Challenge Cup.

During the 1930s, Wimborne Town won the Dorset League Division Two championship three times, finished runners-up on a further occasion and were runners-up in Dorset League Division One in 1939. They also enjoyed success in cup competitions, winning the Dorset Junior Challenge Cup twice in their final three appearances in the competition, as well as the Dorset Junior Amateur Cup four times in five seasons between 1935 and 1939.

Wimborne Town's first senior honour came in 1937 by winning the Dorset Senior Amateur Cup and repeating this success in 1964. In 1957, Wimborne became founder members of the Dorset Combination (now the Dorset Premier League) but returned to the Dorset League after just a season where they remained until 1973 when they returned for another spell, this time lasting three seasons.

Wimborne's fortunes dramatically took off when they won the Dorset League Division One title in 1980–81 without losing a match. In 1981, following the installation of floodlights and the construction of a perimeter wall and new changing rooms at their Cuthbury ground, Wimborne Town were directly admitted to the First Division of the Western League. Despite missing out the Dorset Combination, they immediately made an impact by just losing out on third spot to local rivals Swanage Town & Herston on goal difference.

Wimborne Town entered both the FA Cup & FA Vase for the first time in 1982–83. That season brought them their best run to date in the FA Cup when defeats of Bridport, Falmouth Town, St Blazey, Bath City and Merthyr Tydfil earned them a visit to Aldershot, in the First Round Proper where they lost 0–4. 1984–85 was Wimborne Town's most successful season in the Western League when they finished in third place, this time ahead of Swanage on goal difference.

In 1987, Wimborne Town joined the Wessex League, which they played in up until the 2009–10 season, never finishing outside the top eight. The club have won the Wessex Championship on three occasions, in 1991–92, 1993–94 and 1999–2000— and finished runners-up in 1992–93, 1996–97 & 2009–10.

Before 1992, Wimborne Town's best performances in the FA Vase had brought them to the third round proper on three occasions. However, in 1991–92, the Club enjoyed a run to the Wembley final under joint managers Alex Pike and Nick Jennings, where they defeated favourites Guiseley 5–3 to lift the trophy. In so doing, Wimborne Town became the first ever Dorset club at any level to contest a Wembley final. During that same season, Wimborne Town also won the Dorset Senior Challenge Cup and Wessex League championship to complete a treble of trophies.

They won the Wessex League Cup in 1993–94 becoming the first club to achieve the league and cup double. That feat was repeated in 1999–2000 when Wimborne Town finished ahead of Lymington & New Milton on goal difference in the league and beat them 1–0 in the League Cup final, the last time the club won this trophy was the 2007–08 season when they beat Moneyfields FC 1–0 at Christchurch's Hurn Bridge ground.  At the end of the 2009–10 season, after years of ground grading issues, they were promoted to the Southern Football League (South & West Division) with a second-place finish in the league. They have since remained in the Southern League Division One South & West.
In 2011–12, they reached the final of the Dorset Senior Cup, where they lost 2–0 to Dorchester Town at Hamworthy United Football Club.
In 2014–15, Wimborne had reached its highest position with the current English football league pyramid system and achieved its highest run in the 1st Round of the FA Trophy.

In January 2016, the club unveiled Harry Redknapp as a director, his first return to football since leaving Queens Park Rangers in February 2015. During the 2017–18 season, Wimborne achieved a third placed finish and despite defeat to Swindon Supermarine on penalties in the play-off final, Wimborne achieved promotion to Step 3 for the first time in their history following the withdrawal of Shaw Lane and the restructuring of the teams. They remained at this level for three seasons, suffering relegation in their fourth season at the level.

Ground

Wimborne Town play their home games at New Cuthbury, 16 Ainsley Road, Wimborne, BH21 2FU . Previously they played at Cuthbury which was the other [ western side] of Wimborne Minster next to Victoria Hospital. Cuthbury now has houses built on it by Wyatt Homes. The move was included in the Local Plan and had been mooted a decade or so earlier. The new ground is owned by the local council and the club have a long lease from them
As at August 2020 the new stadium is being built on the other side of town to Cuthbury, at Saxonbury. A site down Parmiter Drive, off Leigh Road. The builders are Wyatt Homes who have also built approximately 60 homes adjacent to the new Stadium. The new  clubhouse is due to be handed over to the club on 1 October 2020. There is a main pitch which is grass with floodlights and a 3G practice pitch adjacent. The Stadium conforms to FA grading regulations for games at Step 3 [ Southern League Premier]and has two stands with seating for 250. Both ends of the pitch are covered standing. There is a large clubhouse overlooking the pitch and a  bar, with a main room which can be divided into two if necessary. There is a large car park for 200 cars, plus Disabled and Coach spaces. The whole site can be booked for private functions. The bar and clubhouse is open to the public on non-match days

Club honours

League honours
Wessex League Premier Division :
 Winners: 1991–92, 1993–94, 1999–00
 Runners-up: 1992–93, 1996–97, 2003–04, 2009–10
Dorset League Division One:
 Winners: 1980–81
 Runners-up: 1938–39

Cup honours
FA Vase:
 Winners: 1991–92 
Dorset Senior Cup:
 Winners: 1991–92, 1996–97, 2017–18
 Runners-up: 1998–99, 1999–00, 2009–10, 2011–12, 2012–13
Wessex League Cup:
 Winners: 1990–91, 1993–94, 1996–97, 1999–00, 2007–08 
Dorset Senior Amateur Cup:
 Winners: 1936–37, 1963–64
Dorset Minor Cup:
 Winners: 1912–13
Dorset Junior Challenge Cup:
 Runners-up: 1913–14

Club records

Highest League Position: 3rd in Southern League Division One South & West 2017–18,
FA Cup best performance: First round 1982–83
FA Trophy best performance: First Round 2014–15
FA Vase best performance: Winners 1991–92

Former and current notable players
1. Players that have played/managed in the football league or any foreign equivalent to this level (i.e. fully professional league).
2. Players with full international caps.
David Town
Thomas Clarke
Dan Strugnell
Alex Parsons
Josh Wakefield
Christer Warren
Luther Blissett
Max Cream
Mark Ovendale
Steve Welsh
Jason Harvell
George Webb
Patrick Wilson

References

External links 

 Wimborne Town FC Official Website

Association football clubs established in 1878
Southern Football League clubs
Football clubs in Dorset
1878 establishments in England
Football clubs in England